Prayagraj Junction (station code: PRYJ) is the new name for Allahabad Junction,  a railway station on the Howrah–Delhi main line, Allahabad–Mau–Gorakhpur main line and Howrah–Allahabad–Mumbai line. It is the headquarters of the North Central Railway zone. It is located in Allahabad in the Indian state of Uttar Pradesh. It serves Allahabad and the surrounding areas.

History
The East Indian Railway Company initiated efforts to develop a railway line from Howrah to Delhi in the mid nineteenth century. Even when the line to Mughalsarai was being constructed and only the lines near Howrah were put in operation, the first train ran from Allahabad to Kanpur in 1859. For the first through train from Howrah to Delhi in 1864, coaches were ferried on boats across the Yamuna at Allahabad. With the completion of the Old Naini Bridge across the Yamuna through trains started running in 1865–66.

The opening of the Curzon Bridge, across the Ganges, in 1902, linked Allahabad to regions north of or beyond the Ganges.

The Varanasi–Allahabad City (Rambagh) line was constructed as a metre-gauge line by the Bengal and North Western Railway between 1899 and 1913. It was converted to broad gauge in 1993–94.

Electrification
The Cheoki–Subedarganj section was electrified in 1965–66.

Workshops
There are engineering workshops of Indian Railways at the railway station.

Passenger movement
Allahabad is amongst the top hundred booking stations of Indian Railway. The station has two entry sides i.e. City Side to the south and Civil Lines Side to the north.

Kumbh Mela
The railways make special arrangements for the huge influx of pilgrims for the Kumbh Mela at Allahabad.

Amenities
Prayagraj Junction is an 'A' grade railway station. It furnishes 3 double-bedded AC retiring rooms, 9 double-bedded non-AC retiring rooms, a 20-bedded dormitory and Wi-Fi for the comfort of passengers. The North Central Railways (NCR) have introduced airport like boarding facility so that the passengers will be issued boarding pass to avail facilities at the junction from new state of the art check-in counters.

Gallery

References

External links

Railway junction stations in Uttar Pradesh
Railway stations in Allahabad district
Allahabad railway division